"Missing Piece" is a song by Australian singer-songwriter Vance Joy, released on 21 May 2021 through Liberation Music as the lead single from Joy's third studio album, In Our Own Sweet Time. 

Describing the song as about "being separated from someone you love", Joy promoted the song with various merchandise. "Missing Piece" made its television debut in the seventeenth season of American medical drama Grey's Anatomy.

At the 2021 ARIA Music Awards, the song won Best Video for Annelise Hickey's directed video; "Missing Piece" was also nominated for Song of the Year, Best Pop Release and Best Independent Release; Vance Joy was nominated for Best Artist.

At the APRA Music Awards of 2022, the song was nominated for Most Performed Australian Work and Most Performed Alternative Work

At the AIR Awards of 2022, the song was nominated for Independent Song of the Year.

Background
Upon release, Joy said: "'Missing Piece' is a song about being separated from someone you love. It can be tough but when what you have is good you know that these separations are just small stuff; you're both holding the line. It's about the stillness you find when you are together."

Marketing
Joy promoted the single with merchandise including an embroidered blue jumper and a white t-shirt featuring the running woman shown on the cover art.

Critical reception
Ellise Shafer from Variety said "'Missing Piece' is a tried-and-true love song, centered on the feeling of finally finding — as the title suggests — your missing puzzle piece.

Joe Vitagliano from American Songwriter called the song "a heartfelt indie-folk anthem" saying "From its sentimental lyrics to its anthemic melodies, the single feels like a perfect match for a variety of meaningful life moments."

In other media
On 20 May 2021, it was announced that "Missing Piece" would debut in the seventeenth season of American medical drama Grey's Anatomy.

Charts

Weekly charts

Year-end charts

Certifications

Release history

References

External links
 

2021 singles
2021 songs
ARIA Award-winning songs
Vance Joy songs
Song recordings produced by Joel Little
Songs written by Vance Joy
Songs written by Joel Little